is a Japanese model and actress. She is known for her role as Sakura Yamanami in the 2014 film High Kick Angels, and a live-action portrayal of Saya Kisaragi in Blood-C series.

She was born in Akita Prefecture but raised in Tokyo. She graduated from Nihon Newart High School and Nippon Sport Science University. She is a first dan holder in karate and judo.

Filmography

Film

Tokusatsu
 Kamen Rider Amazons – Nozomi Takai (2016-17)
 Ultraman Z – Alien Pitt "Fa" (2020)

Stage

References

External links
Official agency profile

21st-century Japanese actresses
1996 births
Living people
People from Tokyo
Models from Tokyo Metropolis